The Grenzlandring (German for "border-region ring"), sometimes written Grenzland-Ring, is a former high-speed oval race track in the Lower Rhine area of Germany, around the town of Wegberg, located close to Mönchengladbach and the Dutch town of Roermond.

The Grenzlandring, to many foreigners also known as Wegbergring or Wegberg-Ring, is told to be "discovered" nearly undamaged after World War II when during one dark night in 1947, Dr. Carl Marcus, town mayor of nearby Rheydt, drove along a more or less straight looking country road. When he passed a bicycle rider more than once, he suddenly realized that this road must be a full circle. As it was intended for military purposes, the construction had not made been public nor was the road shown on maps. This story today is considered part of a marketing strategy since parts of the ring had been used by US and British military immediately after the war and had in no way been unknown.

Initiated and organised by the silk weaving mill owner and keen racing driver Emil "Teddy" Vorster (Rheydt) and his Rheydter Club für Motorsport (RCM) (from 1949 on the organisation was in the hands of the Motorsport-Union-Grenzlandring, a co-operation of four motorsport clubs of the Lower Rhine region) the first race was held on September 19, 1948, in front of about 250,000 spectators, although "just" 100,000 people had been expected to show up.

Although the actual event was not stopped to avert panic among the crowds racing was subsequently banned from the venue by the government, after a total of four anti-clockwise and only one (in 1949) clockwise driven competitions that had been attended by up to 300,000 people.

See also

List of motor racing tracks
Superspeedway

External links 
 http://www.forix.com/8w/6thgear/grenzlandring.html
 http://www.grenzlandring.de/ 
 https://web.archive.org/web/20051101233858/http://www.landkartenarchiv.de/rennstrecken_grenzland.htm 
 http://www.oldtimer.de/aktuelles/Grenzland/Grenzlandring_Revival.htm
 Dr. Carl Marcus, the MI6 asset codenamed 'Dictionary'

Defunct motorsport venues in Germany
Sports venues in North Rhine-Westphalia